The following is a list of game boards of the Parker Brothers/Hasbro board game Monopoly adhering to a particular theme or particular locale in South America. Lists for other regions can be found here. The game is licensed in 103 countries and printed in 37 languages.

Argentina

Brazil

Chile 
Metropoli - Each square is an important street from Santiago.

Colombia 
Each color group is a different city, including Bogotá, Medellín, Cali, Cartagena, etc.

Ecuador

Paraguay 
Paraguay Edition - Under the name El Banquero (like its Uruguayan counterpart) this unlicensed version includes the main streets of the capital city of Asunción, and uses the Guaraní as its currency. The dearth of railway lines in the city has been worked round by having Railway Station, Bus Station, River Harbour and Airport instead of the various railway terminals we find in most versions.

Peru 
Lima Edition

Uruguay 
Uruguay Edition -  An unlicensed version under the name El Banquero (The Banker).

Venezuela

References

External links 
 Over 1700 Monopoly versions, updated continuously (some unofficial)
 Database of street names in local editions
 Rich Man series review (Chinese)
 Bucharest Version: Detailed article
 Nearly one hundred monopoly boards listed at MonopolyBoards.Info

Monopoly (game)
Monopoly

it:Edizioni del Monopoli